Macrosmia phalacra is a species of rattail known from the Ninety East Ridge in the Indian Ocean.

References
 

Macrouridae
Monotypic fish genera
Fish of the Indian Ocean
Fish described in 1983
Taxa named by Nigel Merrett
Taxa named by Yuri Igorevich Sazonov
Taxa named by Yuri Nikolaevich Shcherbachev